The Sea and Cake is the debut studio album by American indie rock band The Sea and Cake. It was released on October 20, 1994 by Thrill Jockey.

Track listing

References

The Sea and Cake albums
1994 debut albums
Thrill Jockey albums
Albums produced by Brad Wood